was a Japanese writer from Takaoka, Toyama, Japan.

External links
Short biography

1876 births
1934 deaths
Japanese writers
People from Toyama Prefecture
Writers from Toyama Prefecture